Sierra Leone is a country in western Africa.

Sierra Leone may also refer to:

Places
 Sierra Leone Colony and Protectorate, the British colonial administration in Sierra Leone from 1808 to 1961
 Sierra Leone (1961–1971), a former sovereign state with Queen Elizabeth II as its head of state
 Sierra Leone hotspot, a proposed hotspot in the Atlantic Ocean
 Sierra Leone River, a river estuary on the Atlantic Ocean in western Sierra Leone

Businesses and organisations
 Sierra Leone Airways, the former national airline of Sierra Leone
 Sierra Leone Brewery Limited, a Sierra Leonean brewing company
 Sierra Leone Broadcasting Corporation, the national radio and television broadcaster in Sierra Leone
 Sierra Leone Commercial Bank, a Sierra Leonean commercial bank
 Sierra Leone Company, the corporate body involved in founding Freetown, Sierra Leone

Other uses
 "Sierra Leone" (song), a 1983 single by New Zealand pop band Coconut Rough